Supaporn Gaewbaen (born 4 March 1985) is a Thai former footballer who played as a midfielder. She has been a member of the Thailand women's national team.

International goals

References

1985 births
Living people
Women's association football midfielders
Supaporn Gaewbaen
Supaporn Gaewbaen
Footballers at the 2014 Asian Games
Supaporn Gaewbaen
Supaporn Gaewbaen